Itaituba is a genus of longhorn beetles of the subfamily Lamiinae, containing the following species:

 Itaituba miniacea (Bates, 1866)
 Itaituba pitanga Galileo & Martins, 1991

References

Hemilophini
Cerambycidae genera